A  ("Book of Torah";) or Torah scroll is a handwritten copy of the Torah, meaning the five books of Moses (the first books of the Hebrew Bible). The Torah scroll is mainly used in the ritual of Torah reading during Jewish prayers. At other times, it is stored in the holiest spot within a synagogue, the Torah ark, which is usually an ornate curtained-off cabinet or section of the synagogue built along the wall that most closely faces Jerusalem, the direction Jews face when praying.

History

The En-Gedi Scroll is an ancient Hebrew parchment found in 1970 at Ein Gedi, Israel. Radiocarbon testing dates the scroll to the third or fourth century CE (210–390 CE), although paleographical considerations suggest that the scrolls may date back to the first or second century CE. This scroll was discovered to contain a portion of the biblical Book of Leviticus, making it the earliest copy of a Torah book ever found in a Holy Ark. The deciphered text fragment is identical to what was to become during the Middle Ages the standard text of the Hebrew Bible, known as the  Masoretic Text, which it precedes by several centuries, and constitutes the earliest evidence of this authoritative text version. Damaged by a fire in approximately 600 CE, the scroll is badly charred and fragmented and required noninvasive scientific and computational techniques to virtually unwrap and read, which was completed in 2015 by a team led by Prof. Seales of the University of Kentucky.

Usage
Torah reading from a Sefer Torah or Torah scroll is traditionally reserved for Monday and Thursday mornings, as well as for Shabbat, fast days, and Jewish holidays. The presence of a quorum of ten Jewish adults (minyan) is required for the reading of the Torah to be held in public during the course of the worship services. As the Torah is sung, following the often dense text is aided by a yad ("hand"), a metal or wooden hand-shaped pointer that protects the scrolls by avoiding unnecessary contact of the skin with the parchment.

All Jewish prayers start with a blessing (berakhah), thanking God for revealing the Law to the Jews (Matan Torah), before Torah reading and all days during the first blessings of the morning prayer (Shacharit).

Production

According to halakha (Jewish law), a Sefer Torah is a copy of the Hebrew text of the Torah handwritten on special types of parchment  by using a quill or another permitted writing utensil, dipped in ink. Producing a Torah scroll fulfills one of the 613 commandments.

Written entirely in Biblical Hebrew, a Torah scroll contains 304,805 letters, all of which must be duplicated precisely by a trained scribe, or sofer, an effort which may take as long as approximately one and a half years. An error during transcription may render the Torah scroll pasul ("invalid"). According to the Talmud, all scrolls must also be written on gevil parchment that is treated with salt, flour and m'afatsim (a residue of wasp enzyme and tree bark) in order to be valid. Scrolls not processed in this way are considered invalid.

There are only two types of kosher parchment allowed for a Torah scroll: gevil and klaf. The ink used is subject to specific rules. After the preparation of the parchment sheet, the scribe must mark out the parchment using the sargel ("ruler") ensuring the guidelines are straight. Only the top guide is done and the letters suspended from it. Most modern Torah scrolls are written with forty-two lines of text per column (Yemenite Jews use fifty-one). Very strict rules about the position and appearance of the Hebrew alphabet are observed. Any of several Hebrew scripts may be used, most of which are fairly ornate and exacting. The fidelity of the Hebrew text of the Tanakh, and the Torah in particular, is considered paramount, down to the last letter: translations or transcriptions are frowned upon for formal service use, and transcribing is done with painstaking care.

Some errors are inevitable in the course of production. If the error involves a word other than the names of God the mistaken letter may be obliterated from the scroll by scraping the letter off the scroll with a sharp object. If the name of God is written in error, the entire page must be cut from the scroll and a new page added, and the page written anew from the beginning. The new page is sewn into the scroll to maintain continuity of the document. The old page is treated with appropriate respect, and is buried with respect rather than being otherwise destroyed or discarded.

The completion of the Torah scroll is a cause for great celebration, and honoured guests of the individual who commissioned the Torah are invited to a celebration wherein each of the honored guests is given the opportunity to write one of the final letters. It is a great honour to be chosen for this.

Commandment to write a scroll

It is a religious duty or mitzvah for every Jewish male to either write or have written for him a Torah scroll. Of the 613 commandments, one – the 82nd as enumerated by Rashi, and the final as it occurs in the text the Book of Deuteronomy – is that every Jewish male should write a Torah scroll in his lifetime.  This is law number 613 of 613 in the list of Laws of the Torah as recorded by Rabbi Joseph Telushkin in his book "Biblical Literacy", 1st edition, New York: Morrow 1997, p. 592: "The commandment that each Jew should write a Torah scroll during his lifetime."

It is considered a tremendous merit to write (or commission the writing of) a Torah scroll, and a significant honour to have a Torah scroll written in one's honour or memory.

Professional scribes (soferim)

In modern times, it is usual for some scholars to become soferim and to be paid to complete a Torah scroll under contract on behalf of a community or by individuals to mark a special occasion or commemoration. Because of the work involved, these can cost tens of thousands of US dollars to produce to ritually proper standards.

Chumash

A printed version of the Torah is known colloquially as a Chumash (plural Chumashim). Although strictly speaking it is known as Chamishah Chumshei Torah (Five "Fifths" of Torah). They are treated as respected texts, but not anywhere near the level of sacredness accorded a Torah scroll, which is often a major possession of a Jewish community. A chumash contains the Torah and other writings, usually organised for liturgical use, and sometimes accompanied by some of the main classic commentaries.

Torah ark

External decorations

The gold and silver ornaments belonging to the scroll are collectively known as kele kodesh (sacred vessels). The scroll itself will often be girded with a strip of silk (see wimpel) and "robed" with a piece of protective fine fabric, called the "Mantle of the Law". It is decorated with an ornamental priestly breastplate, scroll-handles (‘etz ḥayyim), and the principal ornament—the "Crown of the Law", which is made to fit over the upper ends of the rollers when the scroll is closed. Some scrolls have two crowns, one for each upper end. The metalwork is often made of beaten silver, sometimes gilded. The scroll-handles, breastplate and crown often have little bells attached to them.

The housing has two rollers, each of which has two handles used for scrolling the text, four handles in all. Between the handles and the rollers are round plates or disks which are carved with images of holy places, engraved with dedications to the donor's parents or other loved ones, and decorated with gold or silver.

Mizrachi and Romaniote traditions

In the Mizrachi and Romaniote traditions, the Torah scroll is generally not robed in a mantle, but rather housed in an ornamental wooden case which protects the scroll, called a "tik", plural tikim. On the other hand, most Sephardic communities — those communities associated with the Spanish diaspora, such as Moroccan Jews, the Spanish and Portuguese Jews (with the exception of the Hamburg tradition), and the Judaeo-Spanish communities of the Ottoman Empire — do not use tikim, but rather vestidos (mantles).

Inauguration

The installation of a new Torah scroll into a synagogue, or into the sanctuary or study hall (beth midrash) of a religious school (yeshiva), rabbinical college, university campus, nursing home, military base, or other institution, is done in a ceremony known as hachnosas sefer Torah, or "ushering in a Torah scroll"; this is accompanied by celebratory dancing, singing, and a festive meal.

Biblical roots
This practice has its source in the escorting of the Ark of the Covenant to Jerusalem, led by King David. As described in the Books of Samuel, this event was marked by dancing and the playing of musical instruments. Both the priests or kohanim and David himself "danced before the Ark" or "danced before the Lord".

Handling the scroll

Special prayers are recited when the Torah scroll is removed from the ark and the text is chanted, rather than spoken, in a special melodic manner (see Cantillation and Nigun). Whenever the scroll is opened to be read it is laid on a piece of cloth called the mappah. When the Torah scroll is carried through the synagogue, the members of the congregation may touch the edge of their prayer shawl (tallit) to the Torah scroll and then kiss the shawl as a sign of respect.
As it is important to guard the sanctity of a Torah, dropping it, or allowing it to fall, is regarded as 
a desecration, though the belief that a person who does, or even witnesses it, this must fast for 40 days has little support from the Talmud.

See also

 Five Megillot (the "Five Scrolls"),  parts of the Hebrew Bible traditionally grouped together
 Hakhel, biblical commandment to assemble for a Torah reading
 Ktav Ashuri, the Aramaic alphabet adopted by Judaism
 List of Hebrew Bible manuscripts - list of ancient scrolls and codices
 Tikkun (book), used to prepare for the reading of Torah scroll in synagogue
 Torah scroll (Yemenite), the specific Yemenite (as opposed to Ashkenazi or Sephardic) tradition of writing the Torah scroll
 Universal Torah Registry, an initiative to prevent Torah scroll theft

References

External links

 Three complete kosher Torah scrolls for study online (Congregation Beth Emeth of Northern Virginia)
 Torah scroll for study online with Megillot and commentaries
 Computer-generated Torah scroll for study online with translation, transliteration and chanting (WordORT)
 Scroll of the Law article from the Jewish Encyclopedia
 Examples of ancient Torah Scrolls
 ≈800-year-old Torah (pictures)
 Examples of Torah Covers Torah Mantles

  
Hebrew calligraphy
Hebrew Bible words and phrases
Hebrew words and phrases
Hebrew words and phrases in Jewish law
Jewish prayer and ritual texts
Jewish ritual objects
Uses of leather in Judaism